Johannes Haushofer is an economist and professor of economics at the Department of Economics, Stockholm University. He was previously an assistant professor of psychology and public affairs at Princeton University.

Haushofer's research is mainly in development economics and behavioral economics. Among other things, he has studied the effects of the NGO GiveDirectly's unconditional cash transfers to poor households in Kenya.

Haushofer has also received media attention for publishing a "CV of failures" on his website.

References

Academic staff of Stockholm University
Living people
Year of birth missing (living people)